Neverice is a village and municipality in Zlaté Moravce District of the Nitra Region, in western-central Slovakia.

History
In historical records the village was first mentioned in 1275.

Geography
The municipality lies at an altitude of 180 metres and covers an area of 5.96 km². It has a population of about 675 people.

References

External links
http://www.e-obce.sk/obec/neverice/neverice.html

Villages and municipalities in Zlaté Moravce District